Skrobek is a surname. Notable people with the surname include:

Aron Skrobek (1889–1943), Polish trade unionist and journalist
Gerhard Skrobek (1922–2007), German sculptor
Ryszard Skrobek (born 1951), Polish chess player

See also
Skrbek